Cyclophora landanata is a moth in the  family Geometridae. It is found in Angola.

References

Endemic fauna of Angola
Moths described in 1898
Cyclophora (moth)
Insects of Angola
Moths of Africa